Bolívar, una lucha admirable (English: Bolívar, an admirable fight), or simply Bolívar, is a Colombian Spanish-language historical drama television series created by Juana Uribe, based on the life of Venezuelan liberator Simón Bolívar. The series stars Luis Gerónimo Abreu as Bolívar as an adult, José Ramón Barreto as Bolívar as a young man, Irene Esser as Bolívar's wife María Teresa del Toro, and Shany Nadan as his lover Manuela Sáenz. Maximiliano Gómez stars as Bolívar as a child. It was released on Netflix worldwide, except for Colombia, on 21 June 2019, followed by its debut in Colombia on Caracol Televisión on 18 September 2019.

The show is made up of 60 episodes that document the events of Bolívar's life from the age of seven until his death, primarily focusing on his formation as the liberator of several South American countries and his romantic engagements. However, the cast and crew also describe the show as an attempt to remove the veil of heroism covering the man and re-humanize him.

It was popular in Latin America, but the telenovela style and format alienated international viewers. Before its release, the show was publicly criticized by Venezuelan president Nicolás Maduro, with commenters believing he was concerned that a less legendary image of Bolívar would further reduce his popular support.

Plot 
The story begins with Simón Bolívar as a soldier rousing his comrades who have grown weary in the fight for independence, before flashing back to his wedding day in Spain and again to his childhood. A young Simón enjoys all the luxuries of a criollo life until his mother, then grandfather, die, leaving his future in the hands of a maternal uncle who wants to take the Bolívar fortune as his own. Simón, an active child, finds it hard to respond to traditional tutelage and is put under the care of a rebel, watching as the Spanish crown punishes dissenters. As he ages into young adulthood, he initially joins the military, but finds more success as a statesman, and travels to Spain to both further his education and seek the title afforded his name.

Arriving in Spain, two of his wayward uncles have managed to make waves in society and introduce Simón to a suitable tutor who is well-regarded by the crown. It is under his care that Simón meets María Teresa del Toro whom he intends to woo; unfortunately, an entitled Spaniard also wishes to pursue her, and tries to dirty Bolívar's name in the process. Through his charm and wit, Bolívar comes through his time in Spain a more well-regarded man and returns to Venezuela; he is without the title he was after, but with María Teresa as his bride.

María Teresa immediately takes to helping at the haciendas and humanizing the workers and slaves; she is also infinitely loyal to Simón, and purchases back his beloved house slave Matea. In the meantime, a new royal judge is appointed to Venezuela, who is friendly with María Teresa and subsequently to the Bolívar family. Simón's eldest sister, María Antonia, begins falling for him after asking for a loan, at the same time as María Teresa begins falling ill from an insect bite that she has not been exposed to in Spain. When she dies, Simón vows he will live in her spirit and never marry again. In Ecuador, a young Manuela Sáenz gets into trouble at her convent.

Simón travels to Paris to drown his sorrows; here, he is reunited with his favorite teacher and his friend Fernando del Toro, cousin of the deceased María Teresa. In Venezuela, María Antonia and the judge begin an affair, from which she becomes pregnant, and their greedy uncle dies destitute. Simón is encouraged to start living rather than drinking and sleeping around by his reunited companions, and ultimately enrages Napoleon's adopted son enough to have himself firmly barred from the city; he returns to Venezuela to meet with the Caracas junta trying to govern Venezuela and propose a movement to independence. In Quito, Manuela begins to behave in order to be let out of the convent, succeeding and witnessing the 2 August uprising; her father feels she sympathizes with the cause too strongly and sends her to live with a maternal uncle, a priest, not knowing that he craves revolution, too.

Cast and characters 
An extensive cast list was published in July 2019 by Peruvian outlet El Comercio. In March 2018, Caracol announced members of the cast.

 Luis Gerónimo Abreu as Simón Bolívar
 José Ramón Barreto as Young Simón
 Maximiliano Gómez as Child Simón
 Rosmeri Marval as María Antonia Bolívar Palacios
 Erick Rodríguez as Pablo Clemente Palacios
 Adrián Makala as José Palacios (mayordomo)
 Irene Esser as María Teresa Rodríguez del Toro y Alaysa
 Mauro Donetti as Feliciano Palacios de Aguirre y Ariztía-Sojo y Gil de Arratia
 Álvaro Bayona as Carlos Palacios y Blanco
 Juan Ángel as Bernardino del Toro Alayza 
 Nohely Arteaga as María de la Concepción Palacios y Blanco 
 Bryan Ruiz as Juan Vicente Bolívar
 Leónidas Urbina as José Antonio Páez
 Hans Martínez as Francisco de Paula Santander
 Juan Fernando Sánchez as José María Córdova
 Jefferson Quiñones as Dionisio Bolívar
 Adolfo Murillo as Child Dionisio
 Mauricio Mejía as Juan José Rondón
 Ed Hughes as Daniel Florencio O'Leary
 Juan Carlos Ortega as General James Rooke
 Abril Schreiber as Pepita
 Adelaida Buscato as Lucía
 Carlos Gutiérrez as Joaquín Montesinos
 Bárbara Perea as Hipólita Bolívar
 Margoth Velásquez as Tomasa
 Jorge Sánchez as Luis Tinoco
 Ana Harlem as Matea Bolívar
   
 Juan de Xaraba as José Patricio de Rivera
 Pablo Soler as Secretario Oídor
 Laura Leyton as Juana Nepomucena
 Giroly Gutiérrez as Doctor Virgilio Trespalacios
 Pedro Roda as Soldado Ponte
 Esperanza Rivas as Mirta María
 Carlos Andrés Ramírez as Antonio Nariño
 Manuel Vallejo as Víctor
 Félix Antequera as Francisco de Miranda
 José María Galeano as Felipe Martínez

Production

Development
The show was one of Colombia's most expensive to produce ever, with its producers describing it as the "most ambitious series in the history of Colombian television." It was created by Caracol and co-produced with Netflix, which has a global distribution deal for the series; Netflix has previously distributed several Caracol shows, including The Girl, The Queen of Flow, Undercover Law, and Surviving Escobar: Alias JJ. The show is not dubbed into English, unlike other Spanish-language media on Netflix, but has subtitles in English, Portuguese, and Spanish.

According to Semana, Caracol did not use deadlines when creating the series, instead letting their teams work to make the show as good as it could be. Additionally, as the landmark series produced for the company's 50th anniversary and the bicentennial of independence, it was reportedly given "unequaled scrutiny". The producers considered many influences and potential creatives for the show, looking at the best of Colombian telenovelas like Yo soy Betty, la fea, and talent including screenwriter Julio Jimenez and actor Diego Álvarez. Ultimately, Juana Uribe was chosen to be showrunner and head writer. Uribe then brought on two historians, a researcher, and three writers "who had read practically every biography in existence" about Bolívar. Rather than a straight telenovela, the show has been described as an historical biography or period drama, as well.

As a period drama, the show used costume design to present the period accurately; the hats worn by Manuela have been described as exact to the different locales she inhabits, as well as period. Shany Nadan also commented that because of the different views on personal appearance at the time, "it did not matter if [she] showed up with rumpled hair" to film, as that is how it would have been in reality.

Casting and characterization 

On 7 March 2018, José Ramón Barreto and Irene Esser were confirmed as protagonists of the first part of the story. Luis Gerónimo Abreu was confirmed for the second part, along with Shany Nadan to depict Manuela Sáenz. Of the three actors to play Bolívar, only one is not Venezuelan: the Colombian actor Maximiliano Gómez. About 400 actors are used in the series, with 6,000 extras.

The storytelling intention during the conception of the series was discussed by Abreu in interviews. According to BBC Mundo, the show "intersperses the story of the young and orphaned Bolívar and the angry, idealistic and passionate Bolívar"; in his interview, Abreu said that the creative team did this because they "wanted to humanize him, with his defects and his mistakes, [...] Because Bolívar was not a bronze superhero like the statues, but a human being, rather small and modest, who without superpowers became a superhero of flesh and blood."

To create the character, Abreu, Barreto, and the writers and directors had meetings where they built their version of Bolívar. They designed him in a way to bring him down to a realistic level rather than be the hero taught in history classes, because, according to Abreu, Venezuelan people think "he was a superhero or that he had a space hammer or that a radioactive spider bit him", referring to popular Marvel Comics superheros. Barreto explains this further, saying that while he felt honored to play the hero he grew up with, he also hoped that the series would allow people to interrogate Bolívar's life and "question for themselves the cult that has been given to 'the military, the boots, the leaders'." Barreto says he hopes for this because of the nation's political crisis, saying that Venezuela in 2019 "doesn't need a liberator [...] We need 30 million liberators, a population who become aware of the historical moment we are in and who do not wait for a liberator. That would be a mistake. We need to mature as a society so as not to repeat those historical errors."

As with Bolívar, Nadan indicates there was the same aim to give her role as Manuela Sáenz a more complex characterization, saying that the production "wanted her to be fascinating and charming, strong but feminine, cunning and strategist, fresh but passionate, proud but also dedicated and generous". She explains that to embody Manuelita, she trained with three acting coaches for several months, exploring what made her the person she was, as well as taking horseback riding lessons. Abreu has said that the show presents an image of Manuela that reinforces the value of women in war.

Barreto was contacted about casting when his telenovela, Para verte mejor (in which he was also co-lead with Abreu), was ending in 2017. To help him land the role, he borrowed a stallion from a friend's club to practice riding on, dressing up as Bolívar to make a demonstration video of his skills and his passion to get the iconic image of Bolívar correct that he sent to the producers. After being cast, he was given more formal horseback riding lessons, as well as combat ones. Of his casting, Barreto says he expected to get the role of Juan Vicente, though he auditioned for Simón, because he does not think he looks like Simón Bolívar; on the press tour he used this story to tell people in Colombia that, unlike what many are used to in the region, television may now be casting more by talent than appearance.

Filming 

Filming of the series began on 7 March 2018 in Cartagena, Colombia. The series was shot primarily in Colombia, featuring cities such as Villa de Leyva, Monguí, Santa Fe de Antioquia, Calí, Popayán, and natural areas in the Los Nevados National Natural Park, El Páramo de Oceta, as well as the Eastern Plains of Colombia. In May 2018, Caracol, with the assistance of local production by Galdo Medio, began filming in Spain. Scenes in Spain were shot in Toledo, with the production also being able to shoot some scenes on the Lavaderos de Rojas estate; in Aranjuez; and in Pedraza. Some parts of the series were filmed between the border of Venezuela and Colombia. Three production units were used, with simultaneous filming lasting from March through September 2018.

Producer Asier Aguilar says that finding locations to recreate the colonial settings was difficult, but that trying to find locations for certain historical moments set in Venezuela was harder because of the country's biodiversity; as an example, Aguilar says that they had to recreate a low-lying coastal Vargas swamp in a town near Boyacá, 3,000 metres up in the Andes mountains.

Reception

Critical response
While some critics found elements of the show enjoyable, many responses have focused on questions of historical accuracy, production value, and the length of the series, knowing it was to be first released around the world.

John Serba's Decider episode one review notes that it covers a lot of history in a short time, with humorous remarks like mentioning that Simón is "not yet 13, but will be by the end of the episode" and suggesting that "[a]t this rate, we'll get back to the revolution in about 30 or 40 episodes". Despite this, Serba was impressed at the money and care put into the show, describing the detail of the soldiers' uniforms and the many background extras in every scene. He settles on calling the show "a soap opera at heart", and notes that though "[t]he production isn't chintzy like a soap opera, [the] 60 episodes must have been cranked out in a similarly quick, efficient manner" – though he writes that the most soap opera-like element is its "uber-melodramatic tone". Serba commends the historical accuracy, but worries that the necessary commitment to 60 episodes may be off-putting for U.S. and UK audiences, who are used to much shorter series and miniseries. On the Decider rating scale, which is either "skip it" or "stream it" (based on video-on-demand terminology), Serba concludes that it is worth it to "stream it".

Kahron Spearman for The Daily Dot was less complimentary. He establishes various historical views of Bolívar and says that "his story deserves an abundance of space, depth, and dignity", criticizing Netflix and Caracol for different elements of the production that he sees as preventing this, including their decision that "an unreasonable 60-episode schedule was something the people required". Compared to Serba, Spearman believes that there was not enough money and care given to the series, and that a shorter run with the same budget would have allowed them to pay more attention to detail; he also comments that so much of the budget was spent on grand orchestral music for even mundane moments that it "proves bloated and silly", and begins to criticize the dialogue writing before suggesting "lazy translations" have muddied this aspect of the show. He does say that the acting is "stronger" than he expected from a telenovela, and specifically congratulated Abreu for "manag[ing] to humanize Bolívar to a great extent", but still concludes that the show's production values and telenovela style make it difficult to watch, especially with a "laborious" 60 episodes of 50 minutes each to be viewed.

An article on the series by famous Venezuelan historian Inés Quintero at analysis aggregator Prodavinci shared some of the same concerns as Spearman, styling her criticism as an argument against the biographical historical drama genre in general through examples of the show, calling it "a story, not history" and saying that while its lack of production value doesn't help, "the fundamental reason" for her to not like the show is a pretense of historical accuracy when its true intentions are "to entertain and engage". Quintero suggests that choosing the flashbacks of the first episode were a tactic used to make the viewers' first image of Bolívar be that of a revolutionary hero, rather than a boy, and accuses the show of creating characters as more interesting and diverse than the real people.

Ecuadorian newspaper El Universo and their media reviewer "Mr Smith" moved away from historical accuracy and reviewed the show as a work of television. Smith said he "forgives" Gómez, the child Simón, for his character, as he had to deal with the "uninteresting" writing of the first few episodes, and commends the other Bolívars, Barreto and Abreu, for their "remarkable job reflecting the eccentricities, convictions and boldness, as well as the sensitivity" of the character. Smith questions why the childhood years were not left out or only included in flashbacks, especially as they serve little to the plot, but writes that "[t]he art direction is pure quality" enough to make him interested in the period where history books have failed. Reviewing more of the series than his counterparts, Smith also describes the chemistry between Abreu and Nadan, who plays the third iteration of Bolívar's lover Manuela Sáenz, positively.

Juancho Parada for El Tiempo questioned if the series was necessary, saying that it was only created for the bicentennial of Colombia's independence and criticizing almost every element of its production and storytelling, as well as saying that the promotional tour was too short to gather interest. Parada suggests that there are other films and series made about Bolívar that are better in terms of production and accuracy that audiences could already watch.

Popular response 

The public response to the show was seen as very positive in Latin America, but it was not as well appreciated in the United States; Semana suggests that this is because of the 60-episode format that is unfamiliar to many of these viewers and seen as too long. However, Abreu thinks that the show was relatively popular worldwide based on his own measurement scale, saying that he is "full of pride" that "on Wikipedia, the first month it aired, it [Bolívar] was among the most searched words".

A former mayor of the Ecuadorian city Guayaquil, Jaime Nebot, watched the show and enjoyed the performance of Guayaquil-born actress Shany Nadan so much that he recommended her to the current mayor, Cynthia Viteri, to be given an official honor. She received the medal of Guayaquil at the time and then, shortly before the Colombian broadcast of the show, was named Tourism Ambassador of Ecuador by President Lenín Moreno.

Maduro criticism

Before the series premiered, it was heavily criticised by Venezuelan President Nicolás Maduro, who was angry about potential defamation, wanting to preserve Bolívar's image and tell everyone that Bolívar was Venezuelan, not Colombian, saying the other country was "running a hate campaign". Abreu, who plays the adult Bolívar in the show, responded to this comment by saying "You will have to watch it first before saying if you like it or not, and we will accept that opinion then, that is what free speech is"; he also said: "I think you have issues that are much, much more important to deal with, though". Nadan, playing the adult Manuela Sáenz, responded more diplomatically by saying that "everyone is free to view the series in their own way". In August 2019, Maduro apologized for his comments and congratulated the actors for their performances.

Analyzing Maduro's criticism, historian Omar Galíndez spoke to BBC Mundo, suggesting that Maduro's "excessive zeal" to control the narrative surrounding Bolívar comes from a Chavist skepticism; that Hugo Chávez' revolution used the ideals and legendary status of Bolívar for its political gain, which, while highly criticized, forms the ideological basis for Maduro's power and support. Diario Las Américas has also stated that they believe Maduro's statements came from a place of wanting sole guardianship of Bolívar's image and a fear of Colombia and the United States using the show to try and overthrow him, additionally noting the politically-sensitive time of its release. One media writer to mention political context, though not acknowledging concern that the show could be politically-motivated, was Brett White, in a series overview; he agrees with Abreu's response, linking to the Wikipedia page about the 2019 Venezuelan presidential crisis in a comment saying that he doesn't have space to explain, "but let's just say that Maduro has a lot more to be worried about than a Netflix series."

Semana described Maduro's criticism of the show as an example of the Streisand effect; by discrediting it before it was even released, he interested more people in Latin America in watching it.

BBC Mundo wrote in July 2019 that "Maduro's statement dominated the first reviews" of the show. In his review of the first episode, John Serba of Decider comments on Maduro's response, noting that Bolívar liberated more than just Venezuela. In Kahron Spearman's highly critical The Daily Dot review, he says that "[i]t's not often that a Netflix series creates political strife", as Maduro's accusations of Colombia had, but assured that though Maduro worried about the series disrespecting Bolívar, "[t]hat's not what he needed to be concerned about", slating the show for its quality and adding that "Maduro had a point". In their medium-focused review, El Universo jokes that they will leave accuracy criticisms to the experts or to "the fan that is President Maduro, who has already made a few comments".

Television broadcast 
The entire first season was first released on streaming service Netflix on 21 June 2019; the series went to air in Colombia on 18 September 2019.

In September 2019 before the show began broadcasting in Colombia, members of its cast took a press tour around the country to promote it. A launch party was held in Cali. 
  
}}

Episodes 
The episodes shown on Netflix and in Colombia have differences. Additionally, on Netflix, the episodes are untitled.

Awards and nominations

Notes

References

External links 

2019 Colombian television series debuts
Cultural depictions of Simón Bolívar
Colombian television series
Spanish-language Netflix original programming
Hispanic and Latino American television
Television shows set in Colombia
Caracol Televisión original programming
2019 Colombian television series endings
2019 telenovelas